Don Fletcher (born 25 April 1958) is a former Australian rules footballer who played with Hawthorn in the Victorian Football League (VFL).

References

External links

1958 births
Living people
Australian rules footballers from Victoria (Australia)
Hawthorn Football Club players